The Isaac Roberts House is an historic house in Sandy Springs, Georgia.

Location
It is located at 9725 on Roberts Drive in Sandy Springs, Fulton County, Georgia, north of Atlanta.

History
The house was built in 1894 for Isaac Roberts, chief engineer for the Roswell Railroad and later founder of the Roswell Bank. It spans 2,730 square feet and contains two stories, four bedrooms, two bathrooms, two parlors, and seven fireplaces.

In 1961, the property was purchased by Ruby and Lloyd Pittman, who are the current owners.

It has been listed on the National Register of Historic Places since April 10, 2008.

References

Houses completed in 1894
Houses in Fulton County, Georgia
Houses on the National Register of Historic Places in Georgia (U.S. state)
Sandy Springs, Georgia
National Register of Historic Places in Fulton County, Georgia